The Star was a sailing event on the Sailing at the 1960 Summer Olympics program in Naples. Seven races were scheduled. 53 sailors, on 26 boats, from 26 nations competed.

Results

Daily standings

Conditions at Naples 
Of the total of three race areas were needed during the Olympics in Naples. Each of the classes was using the same scoring system. The center course was used for the Star.

Notes

References 
 
 
 

 

Star
Star (keelboat) competitions